Narvik is a municipality in Nordland, Norway.

Narvik may also refer to:

Narvik, Norway
Narvik (town), the administrative center of the municipality
Narvik Airport, Framnes (closed)
Harstad/Narvik Airport, Evenes
Narvik Station, a railway station
Narvik Energi, an energy company
Narvik University College, now part of University of Tromsø
Narvik IK, an ice hockey team
FK Narvik/Nor, a defunct association football club

Ships
 Type 1936A-class destroyer, also known as Narvik-class destroyers
 HNoMS Narvik (F304), Oslo-class frigate of the Royal Norwegian Navy
 SS Narwik, Polish steamer named after Narvik

Other uses
Narvik: The Campaign in Norway, 1940, a board wargame simulating the German invasion of 1940
Narvik Sirkhayev (born 1974), Russian footballer

See also
Battles of Narvik, 1940 naval battles in Ofotfjord, Norway
Narvik Shield, a World War II German military decoration 
Narvik Debate, or Norway Debate, a notable debate in the British House of Commons during World War II
Radio Narvik
Narvik (film), a 2022 Netflix movie by Director Erik Skjoldbjærg with Kristine Hartgen, Henrik Mestad & Stig Henrik Hoff